Accessory vein may refer to:
 Accessory cephalic vein, a vein that passes along the radial border of the forearm
 Accessory hemiazygos vein, a vein on the left side of the vertebral column
 Accessory portal vein
 Anterior accessory saphenous vein, a special anterior tributary of the great saphenous vein